The Edmonton LRT Capital Line is a light rail transit line running from northeast Edmonton to the south. Operated by the Edmonton Transit Service, the line provides access to Downtown Edmonton and the University of Alberta. The Capital Line currently consists of fifteen stations, six of which are underground. Seven stations are shared with the Metro Line.

History

On April 22, 1978, the line opened between Belvedere and Central stations. At the time (and for another 37 years) the system consisted solely of the single line. It was not named the Capital Line until 2012 when expansion plans were revealed for additional lines.

The 1980s were a decade of expansion for the Capital Line. It expanded northwards toward Clareview in 1981, and westwards toward Bay and Corona, under the downtown core in 1983. Another underground extension was completed in 1989 with the opening of Grandin, now known as Government Centre.

One station opened in the 1990s, University, in August 1992. The underground station was connected to the downtown leg by the Dudley B. Menzies Bridge.

During the 2000s, under the mayorship of Stephen Mandel, the Capital Line was expanded southward. Health Sciences opened in 2006, the first new station in 14 years. In 2009, McKernan/Belgravia and South Campus opened, followed by Southgate and Century Park in 2010.

After the completion of the south leg of the Capital Line, city council shifted their efforts towards the new Metro Line.

Future

South expansion
In January 2008, Mayor Stephen Mandel announced that the southern leg will be extended further south along 111 Street to Anthony Henday Drive, and then west to 127 Street SW. There will be a station and a 1,100-car Park and Ride between 127 Street and 135 Street at Ellerslie Road. A new LRT maintenance facility will also be built as part of the extension. Eventually, the LRT will continue south for another stop at 41 Avenue SW. City council approved the route to the Ellerslie Station, and for construction to begin on the Park and Ride in July 2009. Construction of the Heritage Valley Park and Ride began in May 2018, and was completed in December 2019. The Transit Centre provides shuttle service to and from Century Park Transit Centre until the Capital Line LRT is extended to Ellerslie Road.

In June 2017, additional preliminary engineering from Century Park to Ellerslie Road was started to review and refresh the 2010 preliminary design, bring the project up to current standards and reflect the principles of Urban LRT. This work was completed in the end of 2018 and looked at the feasibility of adding a station adjacent to Twin Brooks and the potential for crossings to be raised or lowered, from street level, at 9 and 12 Avenues on 111 Street, and at Ellerslie Road. Integration of the stations into the adjacent communities, with respect to aesthetics and materials, was also reviewed. On June 22, 2021, City Council approved the amended plan that includes an elevated station and crossing at Ellerslie Road, and a stop in Twin Brooks.

 An underpass at 23 Avenue, bridges crossing Blackmud Creek and Anthony Henday Drive
 An at-grade station at Twin Brooks
 An operations and maintenance facility south of Anthony Henday Drive
 A combined elevated LRT station, transit centre, and Heritage Valley Park and Ride facility on Ellerslie Road, between 127 Street and 135 Street

In July 2021, the Phase 1 extension was announced as being fully funded with C$ 1 billion in commitments from the city, province, and federal government. The project is expect to begin construction once the Capital Line extension business case has been approved by the Government of Canada's Treasury Board.

The City of Edmonton is also looking into  extending the line even further, now known as 'Capital Line South Phase 2', adding 3 additional stations; Provincial Lands, Heritage Valley and Desrochers. These three stations names, along with Ellerslie station, are placeholders and may change once the stations are built. In 2017, the Government of Alberta announced that a new state of the art hospital would be built near the corner of Ellerslie Road and 127 Street SW. There are no specific plans or timeline for an extension to the Edmonton International Airport and Leduc, but an expansion to the airport is the city's long-term goal. In late April 2012, the city launched bus route 747 from Century Park Station to the airport.

Northeast expansion
In 2008, Edmonton City Council approved a plan to extend the Capital Line northeast by one station to Gorman Towne Centre. On April 30, 2009, Mayor Stephen Mandel announced a $210 million project to extend the LRT system to a new Gorman Station. The expansion beyond Clareview Station was planned to continue along the CN right-of-way to a station and park-and-ride north of 153 Avenue and Victoria Trail. The plan would have received funding from three levels of government. However, funding was shifted to the Metro Line in July 2009 as city officials saw that line as a higher priority for the city. The city has not ruled out a near-future extension to Gorman. The City completed preliminary engineering on this project in 2010, however there is no budget or timeline for design and construction.

From a land use planning perspective, the City of Edmonton has approved two area structure plans beyond Gorman and Anthony Henday Drive that depict different alignments for further LRT extension into Edmonton's far northeast. Adopted in 2010, the Edmonton Energy and Technology Park Area Structure Plan depicts extension of the LRT along 50 Street across Manning Drive to the north, and then generally paralleling Manning Drive to approximately Highway 28A. This ASP qualifies that this "is a potential alignment only, and will be updated to reflect the completed planning for the Northeast LRT when a final route is determined."

Adopted in 2013, the Horse Hill ASP depicts extension of the LRT along 50 Street to the north, and then northeast along Fort Road to Meridian Street before crossing Manning Drive in a northwesterly direction into the Edmonton Energy and Technology Park. This ASP qualifies that "extension of LRT service will be subject to LRT system planning and design, as well as the availability of funding" and that the alignment it depicts "is preliminary and subject to change."

The Capital Line Northeast is part of the Transportation Master Plan's vision to expand LRT service to all sectors of the city by 2040. Preliminary engineering for an LRT extension north of Clareview station was completed in 2010. The city will move forward to design and construction once funding becomes available.

The preliminary engineering project ends at a future station in the Gorman area, north of 153 Avenue and east of the CN tracks.

The project includes:

 A 2.9 km extension north of Clareview station, primarily within the existing CN right-of-way
 LRT station at Gorman, north of 153 Avenue
 Multi-use trail from Clareview station to 151 Avenue, with provision for future connections to adjacent park areas
 Street-level LRT crossings at 144 Avenue and 153 Avenue

Coliseum relocation and additional station
As part of the redevelopment of the Northlands exhibition grounds, plans are in the works to move the current Coliseum station further north and build an additional station to the south of the current Edmonton Expo Centre. More detailed plans and public engagement are scheduled for late 2019.

Stations

Future stations

References

External links
 Edmonton Transit System
 Edmonton Transit System–Future LRT
  published by the City of Edmonton. Animated tour of the Capital Line extension south of Century Park.

 
Railway lines opened in 1978
Rapid transit lines in Canada